The ancient Roman Villa dei Volusii or Villa dei Volusii-Saturnini is an archaeological site located in the municipality of Fiano Romano, next to the ancient Roman town and sanctuary of Lucus Feroniae, along the route of ancient Via Tiberina.

This villa is a unique example of an almost entirely excavated large senatorial villa in Italy.

It was a luxurious villa owned by the politically powerful senatorial family of the Volusii Saturnini, and one of the largest Roman villas.

Discovery 

The discovery of the scale and importance of the site was completely accidental even though a Roman cryptoporticus and related structures in the area were known, and it was very close to the known Lucus Feroniae sanctuary: in 1962 it was found during the construction of the A1 highway at the Fiano Romano tollbooth.

Excavation 

The complete excavation of the entire complex, cut in two by the highway's access ramp, was done from 1962 to 1971 by the highway company (Società Autostrade) with the supervision of the regional cultural heritage department. Then the refurbishment operations continued until the 1990s, with the restoration of the mosaic floors, walls and structures, the setting up of a small antiquarium and lastly, the installation of wooden roofs to protect spaces exposed to atmospheric agents.

History 

This villa rustica fits into the group of villas built in the Roman republican age by the senatorial families not far from Rome, in a fertile and highly disputed territory from the point of view of the real estate market of the time, being not only a country residence but also a large farm.

The villa that can be seen today was largely built around the middle of the 1st century BC by the senatorial family of the Volusii Saturnini, probably on a pre-existing structure that belonged to the Egnatii family, opponents of Augustus who had their assets seized after their death. From the senator Quintus Volusius, a character known to Cicero, the villa passed to his son Lucius Volusius Saturninus (consul 12 BC), cousin of Tiberius, who enlarged the building. He adapted it in the style of Hellenistic villas, in vogue in the Augustan age, equipping it with residential and spa facilities, enriching it with new mosaic decorations and expanding the residential part with the construction of a gigantic peristyle with the lararium with statues of the family's ancestors.

On the death of Quintus Volusius Saturninus who was consul in 56 AD, the villa was probably acquired by the emperor.

Around this date the villa changed radically from a suburban luxury villa into a large agricultural production centre, and this seems to have remained, with a corresponding obvious deterioration of the appearance and decorum of the residential part, up to the end of the 4th century AD. The family died out beyond the middle of the 2nd century. The villa was restored between the 3rd and 4th centuries AD. Traces of devastation (including the violent shattering of the statues) and of fires have been revealed here and there by excavations but the villa was frequented until the 5th century AD, when a small cemetery was set up in the residential part.

Starting from the early Middle Ages, a religious building was first built and then a small fortified centre with towers and, finally, a rustic farmhouse reported in the maps of the area of the 16th century.

Description 

It was built on two levels, the upper one supported by a cryptoporticus which housed the residential part with an atrium, triclinium, tablinum, with large peristyle, garden and lararium. Overall, around sixty rooms have been identified built in the republican and imperial eras. Some rooms retain polychrome mosaics with beautiful geometric decorations often finished with flowers, birds and various symbols.

The original phase from about 50 BC consisted of: a large hexastyle atrium with travertine columns surrounded by a beautiful tablinum flanked by side rooms, a series of rooms of various sizes on the long sides of the atrium which include cubicula, a triclinium and living rooms; below was a viridarium with ashlar columns supporting pergolas, while a portico ran externally along the western side, perhaps to connect the villa with the adjacent fields. The eastern side of the villa had very fine geometric mosaics, among which the one decorating room 18 has a polychrome imitation of Hellenistic carpets. The exceptional opus sectile floor in room 23, one of the oldest known examples of such flooring, seems to date back to this period too.

A second phase from the Augustan period is indicated by opus reticulatum in the western part of the "noble" nucleus. In this phase a series of entrances to the portico were opened and the new wing was given black and white mosaic floors. Among these the floors of tablinum 13 and room 8 stand out for their finesse and complexity. During the first century AD, probably in the Flavian age, there was a radical change in the layout and functions of the villa. In the main nucleus, some floors were replaced; the viridarium with pergola was replaced by a complex series of service rooms (kitchens, storerooms , tubs). A grandiose peristyle with Tuscan travertine columns and a series of small rooms on the three sides of the peristyle was built alongside the western side with the main nucleus. These small rooms - about thirty in all - are generally similar in size with floors of bare rock, except for the central room on the west side which was larger and paved with black and white mosaic and contained an altar, and a marble seat, while a masonry counter in the NW corner of the room bore the long and important eulogy for Lucius Volusius Saturninus (consul of 3 AD) and Q. Volusius Saturninus (consul of 56). In this room (and all around the peristyle) were fragmented portrait statues and marble busts of L. Volusius Saturninus, his wife Cornelia, Q. Volusius Saturninus and perhaps Volusia Torquata known from an epigraph from the Hadrianic age. The lararium of the slaves with a complex set of furnishings, sculptures and inscriptions in the great peristyle is remarkable and was related to the ergastulum or slave quarters (for no less than 500 slaves).

Behind the ergastulum peristyle there is an open corner at the end of a road, evidently used as a point of arrival and parking for wagons from the surrounding countryside. Room 34 at the NW corner of the peristyle is a latrine and along the south side of the same complex are 50 closets intended for washing and bathing, all part of the slave economy of the imperial-age villa.

The site included a cistern and nymphaeums.

The lower part of the site was the pars rustica, or farm which included an oil mill and an ergastulum, a building used to keep dangerous slaves in chains or to punish slaves.

Archaeological site 

The Villa dei Volusii, as well as Lucus Feroniae, was included in the project of the Virtual Museum of the Tiber Valley.

References

Bibliography

External links 

 Official website (in Italian)
 Villa dei Volusii on Lazio cultural heritage department web site (in Italian)

Roman villas in Italy
Fiano Romano